The ZenFone 6 is a 2019 Android-based smartphone that was manufactured, released, and marketed by Asus. It is the only release in Asus' sixth-generation ZenFone lineup and directly succeeds the ZenFone 5Z. Asus chairman Jonney Shih unveiled the ZenFone 6 on 16 May 2019 in Valencia, Spain, and was released in Spain the following day.

The ZenFone 6 has a larger  display, a faster processor, and upgraded cameras than the ZenFone 5Z. The ZenFone 6's flip-up camera module doubles as a front-facing camera. It is the first mobile device Asus released after restructuring its smartphone division in late 2018. The ZenFone 6 was released in the Indian market as the "Asus 6Z".

Despite positive reviews, the ZenFone 6 lacked broad appeal and attracted a niche market of power users and technology enthusiasts. Supply issues resulted in delays and stock shortages, which also interfered with its success. , Asus has not released sales figures for the device, only noting the ZenFone has "created excellent sales".

History

Background 

Before the ZenFone 6 was teased at the Mobile World Congress (MWC Barcelona), information about prototype devices was leaked but none of the depicted devices were marketed to the public. In October 2018, an alleged leak of a prototype smartphone with a semi-circular, off-centre cutout for the front-facing camera was circulated. In February 2019, another leaked image showed a more conventional device with thick bezels and an iridescent back. Both leaked images showed a device with  conventional, vertical, triple-camera array on the rear.

In late 2018, Asus's smartphone division undertook an  billion restructure to focus on "power users and gamers" following the success of the gamer-focused ROG Phone; the new shift in direction was formalised in a resolution by Asus' board of directors on 13 December 2018. Asus announced then-CEO Jerry Shen's departure from Asus, effective 1 January 2019.

At the February 2019 MWC Barcelona, Asus announced a launch date of May 16 that year for the phone and teased its design in a promotional silhouette image of the phone's bezel with no cameras visible. Initially, there were misunderstandings over the launch date after a two-page advertisement in the magazine Mobile World Daily with an incorrect launch date of 14 May 2019 was given to journalists.

In early May 2019, another supposedly leaked image of the ZenFone 6 appeared; it showed a device with a form factor similar to the released product, with a similarly mounted rear dual-camera module and a mechanical slider, a retractable front camera mechanism similar to the one used in the Xiaomi Mi MIX 3 in place of the flip mechanism in the final design.

On 14 May 2019, two days prior to the official unveiling of the ZenFone 6, accurate renderings and specifications of the device were leaked by Taiwanese outlet Sogi.

Release 
On 28 May, India's Delhi High Court issued an interim order restraining Asus from selling smartphones, tablets, and accessories branded "Zen" and "ZenFone" in violation of Telecare Network India's Zen Mobile trademark. This led Asus to rebrand the phone as the "Asus 6Z" for the Indian market.

The initial international release of the ZenFone 6, the novel use of liquid metal for the camera module's casing caused  inventory shortages and delays in many markets. Some model configurations were sold out on the day of release in the United States. From 22 July that year, Asus rolled out an over-the-air update to software update version .167, which caused some users' devices to crash, reboot, or get stuck in a "bootloop". An Asus representative attributed this behaviour to a hardware issue, saying the update triggers a motherboard malfunction, the only solution to which was a motherboard replacement under existing warranty.

The release of the ZenFone 6 was followed that of by Asus' ROG Phone II, which was announced in July 2019 and released in September 2019. The ZenFone supports Google's Android 9 Pie and Android 10, both with ZenUI 6, Asus's customised Android front end. In November 2019, Asus released an Android 10 update for the ZenFone 6, two months after Google's release of the update to Android.

In late August 2019, Asus began recruiting ZenFone 6 users for a beta program for Android 11, which was released to the public in December 2020. The flip-camera design that was introduced in the ZenFone 6 was also used in the ZenFone 7 series and the ZenFone 8 Flip.

Features

Design 

The ZenFone 6 is available in glossy Midnight Black and glossy Twilight Silver, silver-blue shade.
Its unique flip-camera module is similar to that of the Samsung Galaxy A80, which has a combination sliding-rotating main camera. The camera's flip mechanism is driven by a miniature stepper motor and a magnetically linked reduction gearbox, resulting in two-degree microsteps. The gearbox prevents direct, external actuation of the stepper motor, reducing the risk of damage to the stepper motor and the internal mechanisms. The camera module's casing is constructed of an amorphous, metallic alloy that is similar to Liquidmetal in its durability, weight, high yield strength, and anti-wearing properties needed in a mechanical component that is subject to repeated stress.

The  IPS LCD display is marketed as a "NanoEdge display" for the reduced bezel size. The display's Corning Gorilla Glass 6 is curved using Nano Molding Technology. The back panel is formed from Gorilla Glass 3 and has a capacitive fingerprint sensor.

On one edge, the ZenFone 6 has a function-customisable "Smart Key" with tactile indents, a volume rocker, and a power button that are outlined in blue on the black models.

The ZenFone 6 has received the Good Design Award and a iF Product Design Award.

Hardware 
The ZenFone 6 has a Qualcomm Snapdragon 855 system on a chip running at stock clock speed and memory capacities of 6 GB of LPDDR4X RAM and 64 GB of UFS 2.1 storage, and up to 12 GB and 512 GB respectively for the 30th Anniversary Edition.

The device uses a double-layer, stacked motherboard design that has also been used in Apple's 2017 iPhone X and later iPhone models. The motherboard's printed circuit board has Anylayer interconnect technology, resulting in a smaller size, which Asus says enabled them to fit a large 5,000 mAh battery into the chassis.

Software 
The ZenFone 6 was debuted alongside ZenUI 6, a new version of Asus' customisation of the Android operating system that was initially based on Android 9. The ZenFone 6 has software features that are specific to the flip camera, including an object-tracking video mode, an auto-panorama mode, and manual camera-angle controls. Changes to ZenUI 6 include a greater focus on single-handed operation, an overhauled notifications menu, dark mode, and reduced stock applications. Reviewers noted ZenUI 6 provides an experience closer to that of stock Android. Reviewers also praised the relatively frequent software updates. Android 10 was released for the device in November 2019, and Android 11 was released in December 2020.

Edition 30 

On 27 May 2019, during a special press event at Computex, Asus chairman Jonney Shih unveiled the Asus ZenFone Edition 30 to commemorate Asus' 30th anniversary. The phone features an exclusive back design, and upgraded storage and RAM to 512 GB and 12 GB respectively. The Edition 30 comes in matte black with a radial finish and has a stylised, 30th anniversary "A" with a matte black Asus logo. The device's hardware and software features are identical to those of the regular models. It is the only model to come with a 30-month warranty and production was limited to 3,000 units.

Reception 
The ZenFone 6 received positive reviews from media outlets and was praised for its value proposition, long battery life, near-stock implementation of Android, edge-to-edge display, and general build quality for its price. Asus said the device "has been well evaluated and created excellent sales". The ZenFone 6 is one of the 2019 flagship devices that retained the headphone jack.

Concerns over the long-term durability of the device's flip camera, especially its novel design, were raised. Asus rates the mechanism to withstand up to 100,000 actuations. Reviewers praised the versatility of the flip-camera concept but some considered it to be a gimmick. The flip camera enabled the ZenFone 6 to be one of the best selfie cameras of 2019 with a DxOMark selfie score of 98, the highest-yet at the time of review. The phone received a DxOMark camera score of 104, the highest for an Asus device.

Business Insider dubbed the device "the best new smartphone of 2019 so far", Android Authority called it "[a]n absolute steal", while The Verge praised its "incredible battery life".

Critics noted the phone lacks several features that are present on other high-end devices; these include an OLED display, optical image stabilisation, high-speed charging, wireless charging, and water resistance. Reports also noted the lack of advertising and mainstream appeal in western markets. , the ZenFone 6 had sold over 100,000 units in Taiwan, its native market.

References

External links 

 

Android (operating system) devices
Mobile phones introduced in 2019
Mobile phones with multiple rear cameras
Mobile phones with 4K video recording
Discontinued flagship smartphones
Asus ZenFone